Nasarawa State is a state in the North Central  region of Nigeria, bordered to the east by the states of Taraba and Plateau, to the north by Kaduna State, to the south by the states of Kogi and Benue, and to the west by the Federal Capital Territory. Named for the historic Nasarawa Emirate, the state was formed from the west of Plateau State on 1 October 1996. The state has thirteen local government areas and its capital is Lafia, located in the east of the state, while a key economic centre of the state is the Karu Urban Area—suburbs of Abuja—along the western border with the FCT.

Of the 36 states of Nigeria, Nasarawa is the fifteenth largest in area and second least populous with an estimated population of about 2.5 million as of 2016. Geographically, the state is mostly within the tropical Guinean forest–savanna mosaic ecoregion. Important geographic features include the River Benue forming much of Nasarawa State's southern borders and the state's far northeast containing a small part of the Jos Plateau.

Nasarawa State is inhabited by various ethnic groups, including the Koro and Yeskwa in the far northwest; the Kofyar in the far northeast; the Eggon, Gwandara, Mada, Ninzo, and Nungu in the north; the Alago, Goemai, and Megili in the east; Eloyi (Ajiri/Afo) in the south; the Tiv in the southeast; the Idoma in southwest; and the Gade and Gbagyi in the west while the Hausa and Fulani live throughout the state. Nasarawa is also religiously diverse as about 60% of the state's population are Muslim with around 30% being Christian and the remaining 10% following traditional ethnic religions.

In the pre-colonial period, the area that is now Nasarawa State was split up between various states with some states being tiny and village-based as others were part of larger empires until the early 1800s when the Fulani jihad annexed the region and placed the area under the Sokoto Caliphate as the vassal states of Keffi, Lafia, and Nassarawa. In the 1890s and 1900s, British expeditions occupied the area and incorporated it into the Northern Nigeria Protectorate. The protectorate later merged into British Nigeria in 1914 before becoming independent as Nigeria in 1960. Originally, modern-day Nasarawa State was a part of the post-independence Northern Region until 1967 when the region was split and the area became part of the Benue-Plateau State. After Benue-Plateau was split in 1976, what is now Nasarawa State became a part of the new Plateau State until 1996 when western Plateau was broken off to form the new Nasarawa State.

Economically, Nasarawa State is largely based around agriculture, mainly of sesame, soybeans, groundnut, millet, maize, and yam crops. Other key industries are services, especially in urban areas, and the livestock herding and ranching of cattle, goats, and sheep. The state has been beset by violence at various points throughout its history, most notably the ongoing conflict between herders and farmers primarily over land rights. Despite the conflict, Nasarawa has the nineteenth highest Human Development Index in the country and numerous institutions of tertiary education.

History
Nasarawa was established on 1 October 1996 by the Abacha government, splitting it from the today neighboring Plateau State which previously had contained both their territories.

Boundary
Nasarawa State is bounded in the north by Kaduna State, in the west by the Federal Capital Territory, in the south by the states of Kogi and Benue, and in the east by the states of Taraba and Plateau.

Nasarawa has a network of roads within the state, which link all rural areas and major towns. The Nigerian Railway Corporation (NRC) operates train services between Kuru, Gombe and Maiduguri.

Population
Nasarawa State had a total population of 1,869,377 residents as of 2006, making the state the second least populated state in Nigeria after Bayelsa State

Government

The Governor of Nasarawa State is the regional executive of Nasarawa. The state legislature, Nasarawa State House of Assembly, is located in the capital of Lafia.

Local Government Areas 

The State has three National Senatorial Districts, the South, North and West.

Nasarawa State consists of 13 Local Government Areas (shown with 2006 population figures):

List of current Local Government Area Chairmen.

Languages
Languages of Nasarawa State listed by LGA:

In Nasarawa State, there are 25 different ethnic groups. The major ones are Miligi (Koro), Alago, Mada, Gwandara, Kanuri, Hausa, Fulani, Gbagyi, Rindre, Afo, Eggon and Ebira

Religion
The dominant religions in Nasarawa State are Islam and Christianity, although a certain amount of traditional religion is still practised.

Economy

Nasarawa State has agriculture as the mainstay of its economy with the production of varieties of cash crops throughout the year. It also contains various minerals such as salt, baryte, and bauxite, which are mostly mined by artisanal miners.
These mineral resources are also found in Nasarawa State: Coal, Dolomite/Marble, coal, Sapphire, Talc, Quartz, Tantalite, Tourmaline, Mica, Chalcopyrite, Clay, Cassirite, Iron-Ore, Columbite, Galena and Feldspar

Education

The state has a College of Education in Akwanga, Federal Polytechnic Nasarawa, Federal College of Education (Technical) Keana, College of Agriculture in Lafia, Isa Mustapha Agwai I Polytechnic Lafia, Nasarawa State University Faculty of Agriculture Lafia Campus, a newly established Federal University of Lafia, Mewar International University at Masaka, Bingham University at Karu, Hill College of Education Gwanje Akwanga, NACAP polytechnic Akwanga, Command secondary school Lafia, Command secondary school Rinze, Vocational And Relevant technology board, and many primary and secondary schools including the Federal Government Girls College, Keana

Tourism
Nasarawa State is home to the Farin Ruwa Falls in Wamba Local Government area of the state. Farin Ruwa falls is one of the highest falls in Africa.

The Salt Village in the Keana Local Government Area of the State produces naturally iodized salt from the lake located nearby. The town is also the cradle of Alago civilization, one of the major ethnic groups in the state. 
Also notable is the Eggon hills of the Eggon people which is situated around Nasarawa Eggon. This was the hills which the Eggon people had settled and established as an ancestral heritage as well. Tourists love to go hiking on this beautiful and high hill overlooking the Nasarawa Eggon local government and surrounding areas.

Another tourist site in Nasarawa State is the Maloney Hill.

Notable people

Abdullahi Adamu - National Chairman, APC
Imaan Sulaiman-Ibrahim – Director-General of NAPTIP

References

External links

 Nasarawa State website

Nasarawa State
States of Nigeria
States and territories established in 1996
1996 establishments in Nigeria